The iOS mobile operating system developed by Apple Inc. has had a wide range of bugs and security issues discovered throughout its lifespan, ranging from security exploits discovered in most versions of the operating system related to the practice of jailbreaking, as well as bypassing the user's lock screen (known as lock screen bypasses), to issues relating to battery drain, to crash bugs encountered when sending photos or certain Unicode characters via text messages sent through the Messages application, and general bugs and security issues later fixed in newer versions of the operating system.

iOS 4

Alarm clock bugs 
The Alarm feature of the built in Clock app in the iPhone and iPod Touch has been plagued by major bugs in all versions of iOS 4. The first bug noticed was the "DST bug" which was first seen when some countries switched to/from daylight saving time from/to standard time in October or November 2010. It caused recurring alarms to start going off an hour too early or late. Apple promised the bug would be fixed in iOS 4.2, but according to some reports it still exists even in iOS 4.3.1.

The second alarm clock bug discovered was the "New Year's Day bug" which showed up on January 1, 2011 and January 1, 2012. It caused non-recurring alarms to never work. However, two days after each New Year's Day, on January 3, 2011, they "magically" started working again. This bug was seemingly fixed in iOS 4.3.

iOS 5

Battery drain bugs 
Apple confirmed that several battery life bugs were negatively affecting battery life in iOS 5. They attempted to fix these bugs with iOS 5.0.1 and 5.1 but the problem still remained. Finally, these bugs were fixed in iOS 5.1.1.

Wi-Fi 
The launch of the iOS 5 update on October 12, 2011 (including iOS 5.0.1 released on November 10, 2011), led many users to report a major bug causing the device to lose Wi-Fi access. This problem has supposedly been fixed with the release of iOS 5.1.1

SIM card 
Some users of the iPhone 4S and iPad (Wi-Fi + Cellular) reported issues with the SIM card in iOS 5.0, and even though Apple attempted to fix these issues in version 5.0.1 build 9A406 (for iPhone 4S only), they still remained.

Echo bugs 
Some users of the iPhone 4 and iPhone 4S reported issues with having echo problems during phone call in the initial release of iOS 5, which causes echoes to appear randomly during phone calls made through earbuds. The other party in the call is generally unable to hear the conversation due to this problem. Apple has since released version 5.1.1 in an attempt to fix the problem.

iOS 6

Maps 
Apple has admitted that there were several bugs in the mapping app on iOS 6, with cities in the wrong location, some places being missed off altogether, some places misnamed and places of interest in the sea. Problems submitted by users have gradually been addressed with daily updates to Maps.

Bluetooth 
Many users report a problem with Bluetooth audio streaming to a range of compatible devices. The sound cuts out every now and then for no apparent reason. , no solution has been provided by Apple.

Location-based Reminders 
Location-based reminders do not work for iPads, even though they were promised to work on cellular enabled devices. It has later been clarified by Apple that only the 4th generation iPad and the iPad Mini 1st generation or later will be able to use this.

Cellular Network 
In iOS 6.1, users reported problems with cellular connectivity. This was addressed for the iPhone 4S in iOS 6.1.1 which "fixes an issue that could impact cellular performance and reliability for iPhone 4S."

Do Not Disturb 
Many iPhone users experienced a bug with the Do Not Disturb feature when the calendar changed from 2012 to 2013. The feature would be left on past the scheduled time set by the user, allowing texts, notifications, and alarm settings to be missed. The bug was caused by a difference in formatting in the ISO calendar system versus the Gregorian calendar system. Apple did not offer a quick software update for the bug, instead saying that the bug would fix itself on January 7, 2013.

Microsoft Exchange 
Another bug causes issues when iOS devices connect to a Microsoft Exchange server to retrieve email, resulting in message "mailbox server resources are consumed, log growth becomes excessive, memory and CPU use may increase significantly, and server performance is affected". Microsoft have suggested several workarounds, and Apple responded with a KnowledgeBase article describing the cause of the bug and a suggested temporary workaround, promising a fix in the near future, which was then fixed with release of iOS 6.1.2.

Lockscreen bypass code 
On iPhones, another bug found in iOS 6.1 allowing bypassing the lock screen's passcode to temporarily gain full access to the Phone app, by performing a specific sequence of actions on the phone that remained unfixed, with Apple acknowledging the bug and then addressed with release of iOS 6.1.3.

Audio profile speakerphone 
iPhone 5 users experienced dropped calls during the release of iOS 6.1.3 when there was an issue with the audio microphone profile. This also caused issues with many voice-over commands, including Siri, to get different results than expected or to fail easily. Apple fixed this bug with the release of iOS 6.1.4, which updated the audio speaker profile so users would get better results.

FaceTime 
Shortly after Apple released iOS 7, users running iOS 6 were said to have problems using FaceTime. Apple later released a support document stating that this was due to an expired device certificate and that devices that support iOS 7 should update to it in order to resolve these issues. Devices that are unable to run iOS 7, the fourth-generation iPod Touch and the iPhone 3GS, should upgrade to iOS 6.1.6.

Data security 
An attacker can collect or modify data in sessions protected by SSL/TLS protocols. This same bug was also reported on iOS 7.0.4 and iOS 7.0.5 for the iPhone 5C and 5S. For the iPhone 3GS and the iPod Touch (4th generation), iOS 6.1.6 was released to fix this issue since iOS 7 is not compatible with these devices. (see iOS 7.x)

iOS 7

Passcode screen bypass bugs 
A lock screen bypass was discovered within hours of the release of iOS 7, caused by the ability to use the control center through the lock screen and tapping on the camera or timer buttons. The then-latest iPhone models, the iPhone 5S and the iPhone 5C, were not affected. As a workaround, the Control Center can be turned off for the lock screen in the Settings app. This was fixed in iOS 7.0.2.

Motion sickness 
Users complained about motion sickness-like symptoms when using iOS 7 because of the user interface's animation and parallax effects.
In iOS 7.1, a new function in the Settings app named "Reduce Motion" was introduced to reduce the motion of the user interface and disable the parallax effects.

Creation of CardDAV Accounts not working 
Creating a CardDAV Account contains a bug that needs manual fixing of the CardDAV-Server-URL.

Battery drain problems 
In iOS 7.1, users have reported seeing significant drain on their devices' battery after installing the new update.

Safari ignores local domain 
Local domain names can no longer be resolved in Safari. This breaks short names on the local network.

Home screen crashes 
Users have reported various crashes of the home screen, the core service that renders the home screen icons, Notification Center, Control Center, Siri and the lockscreen. This was fixed in iOS 7.1.

Data security 
Secure transport failed to validate the authenticity of connection. This issue was addressed by restoring missing validation steps. This may cause an attacker with a privileged network position to capture or modify data in sessions protected by SSL/TLS. This issue was addressed by the release of iOS 7.0.6.

Battery Indicator stuck until restart 
iPhone 4S users report experiencing problems with the battery indicator; the indicator will freeze at the same value until the iPhone is restarted again.

Touch ID 
In iOS 7.1, Touch ID was not functioning on the iPhone 5S. The problem cannot be resolved by turning Touch ID on and off in the "Fingerprint and Passcode" menu, restarting, resetting, or restoring the device using iTunes. This issue was fixed in iOS 7.1.1.

iOS 8

HealthKit 
Shortly after the release of iOS 8, Apple released a statement pointing out that a bug had been found in the operating system which prevented HealthKit-compatible apps from being released alongside iOS 8. Apps already released that included HealthKit functionality were withdrawn from the App Store. iOS 8.0.1/8.0.2 included a fix for this issue.

iOS 8.0.1 
iPhone 6 and iPhone 6 Plus users who updated to iOS 8.0.1 wirelessly had cellular service and Touch ID disabled due to a software issue. Over-the-Air downloads of iOS 8.0.1 were stopped within an hour of the release of the software, but many early adopters had been affected. These issues were fixed with the release of iOS 8.0.2 a day later.

Touch ID 
Users who updated phones with Touch ID enabled to iOS 8.3 found out that they could not use Touch ID to make App Store purchases. A workaround has been devised by users to repair this issue.

Performance 
Many users of older generation devices such as the iPhone 4S and the iPad 2 reported performance issues with iOS 8. Apple has since released iOS 8.1.1 in attempt to fix the problem.

Keyboard 
Several issues with the new Keyboard API in iOS 8 were reported, including problems with custom keyboards crashing or not appearing, or being replaced with the default keyboard. Apple has since released iOS 8.3 in attempt to fix the problem.

iMessage 
When a specific sequence of Arabic, Unicode, and English characters are sent through iMessage to an iOS device running iOS 8.0 or later, it causes the device to crash. This bug was discovered by a Reddit user in May 2015. Apple has since released a software update (iOS 8.4) to fix this issue.

iOS 9

Game Center 
Many users reported greatly increased Game Center loading times which in turn caused apps that used Game Center logins to appear to load slowly. This was fixed with the release of iOS 9.1.

January 1, 1970 
On 64-bit iOS devices, setting the date to January 1, 1970 and restarting the iPhone would prevent the device from starting up until it lost power or its time setting shifted past January 1, 1970. This was fixed with the release of iOS 9.3.

Error 53 
Updating an iPhone 6 with a replaced Touch ID sensor to a new version of iOS would cause the update to fail and report an "Error 53.", as a result of additional hardware security checks left unintentionally. This was fixed with a re-release of iOS 9.2.1, with build number 13D20.

Error 53 Lawsuit 
Apple faced a lawsuit filed February 11, 2016 over the "Error 53" message that some iPhone users experienced after updating their devices. The lawsuit alleged that Apple's software update caused some iPhones to become "permanently bricked," and that the company failed to adequately inform users about the risks of updating their devices.

9.7-inch iPad Pro bricking issue 
iOS 9.3.2 caused problems for some 9.7-inch iPad Pro owners, with multiple MacRumors readers and Twitter users reporting issues shortly after installing the update over the air. Affected users are seeing an "Error 56" message that instructs them to plug their devices into iTunes.

As a result, iOS 9.3.2 update was withdrawn. This issue was fixed with a re-release version of iOS 9.3.2 in June 2016, with build number 13F72.

iPhone 4S lawsuit 

Apple faced a lawsuit alleging its iOS 9 mobile operating software significantly slowed down the iPhone 4S. The lawsuit filed in New York federal court and first spotted by Apple Insider sought $5 million from Apple.

Bluetooth 
Many iPhone SE owners experienced various issues relating to phone calls via Bluetooth connectivity. This issue was fixed with iOS 9.3.2.

Security 
A WebKit rendering component exploit was discovered that threatened users' security by allowing access to device sensors was discovered with the release of 9.3.3. The exploit worked by tricking the user to click on a URL contained in an SMS. This was quickly fixed with the release of 9.3.5.

iOS 10

Recovery mode issues 
The initial iOS 10 update released on September 13, 2016, saw many iPhones and iPads sent to the recovery mode, requiring devices to connect them to Mac or PC with iTunes in order to retry the update or restore them to the factory settings

As a result, the initial release was pre-installed only on iPhone 7 and iPhone 7 Plus. Apple released iOS 10.0.1 shortly afterwards, and issued an apology.

"30% battery bug" 
Many users, especially those owning an iPhone 6s, reported that their phones would shut down automatically with 30% battery left. This issue was fixed with the release of iOS 10.3.

As of the iOS 10.2.1 release, iOS throttles CPU performance on iPhones with batteries in poor health. Due to poor communication from Apple on the addition of this feature, suspicions about planned obsolescence arose, which eventually led to the Batterygate controversy shortly after the release of iOS 11. As a result, Apple announced battery replacements would be $29 instead of $79. They also announced that iOS 11.3 would show battery health in the Settings > Battery menu and let the user decide if they wanted the previous 30% shutdown behavior or the throttled CPU.

Crash caused by 5-second video 
On November 22, 2016, a five-second video file originally named "IMG_0942.MP4" started crashing iOS on an increasing count of devices, forcing users to reboot. It gained massive popularity through social media channels and messaging services.

iOS 11

Calculator 
Due to a bug related to UI animation, quickly typing in an equation caused the built-in Calculator app to give incorrect answers. The bug was fixed in iOS 11.2.

Mail 
Users with Outlook.com, Office 365, and certain Exchange accounts were unable to send email. This has been resolved with the release of iOS 11.0.1.

AutoCorrect 
Users complained of a bug in the built-in keyboard in iOS 11 that changed the letter "I" to "A [?]", if automatic correction was enabled. This was fixed with the release of iOS 11.1.1.

December 2 respring 
A bug in iOS 11 was present that would cause the device's home screen to constantly crash if an app sends local notifications on or after 00:15 on December 2, 2017. Apple responded by releasing iOS 11.2 early, which fixed the bug.

Telugu character crash 
A bug was present in iOS 10 and 11 that would cause an app to crash when a certain sequence of Telugu characters was pasted into it, or for the phone's home screen if pasted into Spotlight search. The bug was fixed with iOS 11.2.6.

iPhone 8 touchscreen issues after third-party repair 
The iOS 11.3 update caused some iPhone 8 devices that had had their screens repaired by a third party repair shop to become unusable by disabling the touch screen. Apple corrected this issue by releasing iOS 11.3.1.

iOS 12

Group FaceTime bug 

A privacy issue was discovered when using FaceTime in iOS 12.1, that allowed users to eavesdrop the recipient with access to their camera and audio without them answering the call and their knowledge when adding another person to the call. As a result, Apple permanently disabled Group FaceTime in iOS versions 12.1 to 12.1.3. An update was later released on 12.1.4 to fix the bug.

Sending iMessages to the wrong contacts 
iOS 12 merges conversation history for devices using a shared Apple ID, even if separate handles are used, such as unique phone numbers or email addresses. As a result, iMessages may be delivered to the wrong device.

iOS 12.3.2 update incompatibility 
The iOS 12.3.2 update, released for iPhone 8 Plus devices only, caused users to be unable to transfer backups for this version to a different iPhone model as only the 8 Plus has this software update.

iOS 12.4 jailbreak 
A kernel vulnerability that was fixed in iOS 12.3 was accidentally restored in iOS 12.4. This made iOS 12.4 vulnerable to exploits using the vulnerability, and a jailbreak was released. Later, the kernel vulnerability was patched again by Apple in iOS 12.4.1.

iOS 13

Memory management issue 
After the release of iOS 13.2, reports followed about applications being cleared from memory at a higher rate than in iOS 13.1, including on the then latest iPhone models. Apple attempted to fix the issue twice in iOS 13.2.2 and iOS 13.3.

HomePod bricking issue 
According to multiple people on the MacRumors forums and Reddit, the 13.2 update "bricked" their HomePods, rendering them unusable. Users who are seeing problems are experiencing a "white swirl" on both of their HomePods, or an endless reset loop.

As a result, the update for the HomePod was withdrawn by Apple

Apple advices some users not to install iOS 13.2 on the HomePod and advice some users not to reset the HomePod after installing iOS 13.2. This issue was fixed with the release of iOS 13.2.1.

iOS 13.5 jailbreak 
A jailbreak software called Unc0ver was updated in May 2020 with an exploit targeting devices running iOS 11 and above, including the then-latest iOS 13.5. The issue was fixed with iOS 13.5.1.

iOS 14

Missing keyboard for Spotlight search 
The keyboard did not appear when using the Spotlight search function.

Default app setting reset 
The ability to change the default app for messages, email, internet or other services is reset to the stock app every time the device is reset or turned off. Apple attempted to fix the issue with iOS 14.0.1.

General battery drain 
On 30 September 2020, Apple acknowledged a battery drain issue in iOS 14 and released a supporting document that offered the users tricks to fix the poor battery performance. In this document Apple claimed that unpairing the iPhone from an Apple Watch followed by erasing all data and settings of the iPhone, and restoring from a backup could be a possible fix for the battery life.

References 

IOS